Allographa is a genus of script lichens in the family Graphidaceae. It has nearly 200 species. Formally circumscribed in 1824 by François Fulgis Chevallier, Allographa was formerly included in Graphis, but was upgraded to generic status in 2018 by lichenologists Klaus Kalb and Robert Lücking.

Species
Allographa acharii 
Allographa adpressa 
Allographa albotecta 
Allographa altamirensis 
Allographa amazonica 
Allographa anguilliradians 
Allographa angustata 
Allographa apertoinspersa 
Allographa apoda 
Allographa aptrootiana 
Allographa aquilonia 
Allographa argentata 
Allographa asterizans 
Allographa atrocelata 
Allographa atrocelatoides 
Allographa balbisii 
Allographa balbisina 
Allographa bambusicola  – Sri Lanka
Allographa barillasiae 
Allographa bettinae 
Allographa bifera 
Allographa brachylirellata 
Allographa bukittimaensis 
Allographa calcea 
Allographa cameroonensis 
Allographa carassensis 
Allographa celata 
Allographa cerradensis 
Allographa chamelensis 
Allographa chloroalba 
Allographa chlorocarpa 
Allographa chrysocarpa 
Allographa cinerea 
Allographa cleistoblephara 
Allographa cleistomma 
Allographa cognata 
Allographa comma 
Allographa congesta 
Allographa conglomerata 
Allographa consanguinea 
Allographa contorta 
Allographa contortuplicata 
Allographa curtiuscula 
Allographa cylindrospora 
Allographa daintreensis 
Allographa dealbata 
Allographa dispersa 
Allographa dolichographa 
Allographa dotalugalensis 
Allographa elevativerrucosa 
Allographa elixii 
Allographa elmeri 
Allographa elongata 
Allographa epixantha 
Allographa exuta 
Allographa farinulenta 
Allographa firferi 
Allographa flabillata 
Allographa flavens 
Allographa flavoaltamirensis 
Allographa flavominiata 
Allographa fournieri 
Allographa frumentaria 
Allographa fujianensis 
Allographa funilina 
Allographa glauconigra 
Allographa globosa 
Allographa gomezii 
Allographa gracilescens 
Allographa grandis 
Allographa granulata 
Allographa granulosa 
Allographa gregmuelleri 
Allographa hadrospora 
Allographa hainanense 
Allographa hossei 
Allographa hypostictica 
Allographa illinata 
Allographa immersa 
Allographa incerta 
Allographa ingarum 
Allographa inspersostictica 
Allographa inturgescens 
Allographa invisibilis 
Allographa isidiata 
Allographa itatiaiensis 
Allographa jayatilakana  – Sri Lanka
Allographa kamojangensis 
Allographa kansriana 
Allographa knucklensis 
Allographa kuetchangiana 
Allographa laubertiana 
Allographa lecanactiformis 
Allographa leprographa 
Allographa leptospora 

Allographa leucaenae 
Allographa longilirellata 
Allographa longissima 
Allographa longula 
Allographa lourdesina 
Allographa lumbricina 
Allographa lumbschii 
Allographa lutea 
Allographa macella 
Allographa mahaeliyensis 
Allographa malacodes 
Allographa marginata 
Allographa medioinspersa  – Brazil
Allographa mexicana 
Allographa miniata 
Allographa mirabilis 
Allographa multistriata 
Allographa multisulcata 
Allographa myolensis 
Allographa nadurina 
Allographa nana 
Allographa norlabiata 
Allographa norvestitoides 
Allographa nuda 
Allographa nudaeformis 
Allographa obtectostriata 
Allographa ochracea 
Allographa olivacea 
Allographa oryzaecarpa 
Allographa oryzaeformis 
Allographa ovata 
Allographa oxyspora 
Allographa pachygrapha 
Allographa parallela 
Allographa patwardhanii 
Allographa pavoniana 
Allographa pedunculata 
Allographa phaeospora 
Allographa pilarensis 
Allographa pitmanii 
Allographa pittieri 
Allographa plagiocarpa 
Allographa plumbea 
Allographa plurispora 
Allographa polillensis 
Allographa polystriata 
Allographa pseudoaquilonia 
Allographa pseudocinerea 
Allographa regularis 
Allographa rhizicola 
Allographa rimulosa 
Allographa rufopallida 
Allographa ruiziana 
Allographa rustica 
Allographa salacinicum 
Allographa salacinilabiata 
Allographa sarawakensis 
Allographa sauroidea 
Allographa sayeri 
Allographa scaphella 
Allographa schummii 
Allographa seminuda 
Allographa semirigida 
Allographa singaporensis 
Allographa sitiana 
Allographa sitianoides 
Allographa sorsogona 
Allographa sterlingiana 
Allographa stictilabiata 
Allographa striatula 
Allographa subamylacea 
Allographa subassimilis 
Allographa subcelata 
Allographa subdisserpens 
Allographa subdussii 
Allographa subelmeri 
Allographa subflexibilis 
Allographa subimmersa 
Allographa submirabilis 
Allographa subradiata 
Allographa subruiziana 
Allographa subserpens 
Allographa subturgidula 
Allographa superans 
Allographa supertecta 
Allographa tamiamiensis 
Allographa trichospora 
Allographa triphora 
Allographa tumidula 
Allographa upduna 
Allographa upretii 
Allographa uruguayensis 
Allographa vandenboomiana 
Allographa verminosa 
Allographa vernicosa 
Allographa vestita 
Allographa vestitoides 
Allographa wangii 
Allographa weerasooriyana  – Sri Lanka
Allographa weii 
Allographa xanthospora

References

 
Lichen genera
Ostropales genera
Taxa described in 1824
Taxa named by François Fulgis Chevallier